The 2002 season was the New England Patriots' 33rd in the National Football League (NFL), their 43rd overall and their third under head coach Bill Belichick. They finished with a 9–7 record, good enough for second in the division but not a playoff berth. It was their first season at their new home field, Gillette Stadium, which replaced the adjacent Foxboro Stadium.

Following their victory in Super Bowl XXXVI seven months earlier, the Patriots played their first game in the new Gillette Stadium in the NFL's primetime Monday Night Football opener against the Pittsburgh Steelers, a win for the Patriots. After an additional two wins to begin the season, including a 44–7 road win against the division rival New York Jets, the team lost five of its next seven games, allowing an average of 137 rushing yards a game during that span. In the final week of the season, the Patriots defeated the Miami Dolphins on an overtime Adam Vinatieri field goal to give both teams a 9–7 record. A few hours later, the Jets, who defeated the Patriots the week prior, also finished with a 9–7 record with a win over the Green Bay Packers. Due to their record against common opponents, after the Jets won the tiebreaker for the division title, both the Patriots and Dolphins were eliminated from the playoff contention. The 2002 season was the last time that the Patriots failed to win at least 10 games during the regular season until the 2020 season. It also marked the only season when Tom Brady started over half of the regular season games that the team failed to win their division or make the playoffs, and until 2022 the only time that Brady lost three consecutive games.

Offseason

2002 NFL Draft

Staff

Final roster

Regular season

Schedule

Game summaries

Week 1: vs. Pittsburgh Steelers

Week 2: at New York Jets

Week 3: vs. Kansas City Chiefs

Week 4: at San Diego Chargers

Week 5: at Miami Dolphins

Week 6: vs. Green Bay Packers

Week 8: vs. Denver Broncos

Week 9: at Buffalo Bills

Week 10: at Chicago Bears

Week 11: at Oakland Raiders

Week 12: vs. Minnesota Vikings

Week 13: at Detroit Lions

Week 14: vs. Buffalo Bills

Week 15: at Tennessee Titans

Week 16: vs. New York Jets

Week 17: vs. Miami Dolphins

Standings

Notes and references

Further reading

External links
Season page on Pro Football Reference
New England Patriots Super Bowl History

New England Patriots
New England Patriots seasons
New England Patriots
Sports competitions in Foxborough, Massachusetts